Conair or Connair may refer to:

Conair Group, a company formerly known as Conair Aviation, specializing in firefighting apparatus for aircraft
The Justice Prisoner and Alien Transportation System, an airline used to transport convicts to prison in the United States
Con Air, a 1997 film set on the Justice Prisoner and Alien Transportation System
Conair Corporation, a corporation which sells personal care products as well as small appliances for personal use
 Conair of Scandinavia, a former Danish airline (1964–94)
 Connair (Australia), former Connellan Airways

See also
Convair, a similarly titled aviation company.
Conaire (disambiguation)
Continental Airlines